Outfox the Market, the trading name of Foxglove Energy Supply, is a British energy supplier based in Leicester, United Kingdom. It was founded in 2017.

History
In 2019, the Advertising Standards Authority upheld a complaint against Outfox the Market, which forbade it from publishing false claims to the cheapest supplier in the UK, or the cheapest green energy supplier in the UK.

In 2021, it came top in a Which? customer satisfaction survey.
In July 2022, it came second in a survey by Citizens Advice. However, later in the same month, energy regulator Ofgem criticised the company for failing to take action on customer's direct debit problems.

In December 2022, Ofgem served the company with a notice of failure to comply with a confirmed Provisional Order within the meaning of section 25 of the Electricity Act 1989 and section 28 of the Gas Act 1986.
The notice, issued because of Ofgem's concerns over the company's financial viability, forbade Foxglove from taking on any new customers, or taking any money out of the company.

References

External links

British companies established in 2017
Electric power companies of the United Kingdom
Renewable resource companies established in 2017
Renewable energy companies of the United Kingdom
Utilities of the United Kingdom
Electric power companies
Energy companies established in 2017
Companies based in Leicester